The 2002 NCAA Division I baseball tournament was played at the end of the 2002 NCAA Division I baseball season to determine the national champion of college baseball.  The tournament concluded with eight teams competing in the College World Series, a double-elimination tournament in its fifty sixth year.  Sixteen regional competitions were held to determine the participants in the final event, with each winner advancing to a best of three series against another regional champion for the right to play in the College World Series.  Each region was composed of four teams, resulting in 64 teams participating in the tournament at the conclusion of their regular season, and in some cases, after a conference tournament.  The fifty-sixth tournament's champion was Texas, coached by Augie Garrido.  This was Texas' first title since 1983, but Augie Garrido previously won three titles with Cal State Fullerton.  The Most Outstanding Player was Huston Street of Texas.

Due to fears over terrorism and travel security in the wake of the September 11 attacks, the Division I Baseball Committee, which selects the 64-team field and places the teams on the bracket, was ordered by the NCAA to keep regional pairings as localized as possible, in order to minimize the number of plane trips utilized. Due to these travel constraints, teams from the same conference were allowed to play in the same regional for the first time. The travel restrictions were eased in 2003, and the ban on conference teams facing each other in regional play was reinstated.

Bids

Automatic bids
Conference champions from 30 Division I conferences earned automatic bids to regionals.  The remaining 34 spots were awarded to schools as at-large invitees.

Bids by conference

Notes on tournament field
 Central Connecticut State, Elon, Louisville, New Mexico St., and San Diego were making their first NCAA tournament appearance.

National seeds
Bold indicates CWS participant.

Clemson

Texas
South Carolina

Stanford

Regionals and super regionals

Bold indicates winner.

Tallahassee Super Regional

Clemson Super Regional

Atlanta Super Regional

Houston Super Regional

Austin Super Regional
†Arizona State hosted at HoHoKam Park in Mesa, Arizona, where they played their 2002 season due to construction at Packard Stadium.

Columbia Super Regional

Lincoln Super Regional

Palo Alto Super Regional

College World Series

Participants

Results

Bracket

Game results

Championship Game

All-Tournament Team

The following players were members of the College World Series All-Tournament Team.

Tournament notes 

 This was the last College World Series championship to be decided by a single game as the final was moved to a best-of-three format the following year.

References

NCAA Division I Baseball Championship
 
Baseball in Austin, Texas
Baseball in Houston